Libby Szabo is an American politician and a former Republican member of the Colorado House of Representatives. She represented District 27  from January 12, 2011, until her resignation on January 29, 2015.

Szabo is a member of the conservative lobbying group American Legislative Exchange Council (ALEC).  She is the organization's co-state chairperson with Bill Cadman.

Elections
2012 Szabo ran unopposed for the June 26, 2012 Republican Primary, winning with 4,969 votes, and won the November 6, 2012 General election with 23,365 votes (52.6%) against Democratic nominee Tim Allport and her 2010 Libertarian opponent, Bud Martin.
2008 When Democratic Senator Sue Windels retired and left the Senate District 19 seat open, Szabo ran unopposed for the August 12, 2008 Republican Primary, winning with 5,857 votes, but lost the November 4, 2008 General election to Democratic Representative Evie Hudak.
2010 To challenge House District 27 incumbent Democratic Representative Sara Gagliardi, Szabo ran unopposed for the August 10, 2010 Republican Primary, winning with 5,884 votes, and won the three-way November 2, 2010 General election with 14,852 votes (49.2%) against Democratic Representative Gagliardi and Libertarian candidate Bud Martin, who had run for a Senate seat in 2000.

References

External links
Official page at the Colorado General Assembly
Campaign site

Place of birth missing (living people)
Year of birth missing (living people)
Living people
Republican Party members of the Colorado House of Representatives
People from Golden, Colorado
Women state legislators in Colorado
21st-century American politicians
21st-century American women politicians